Ankara International Music Festival is a music festival held annually in Ankara, Turkey. In addition to Turkish artists, performers from many countries have participated in the festival.
The annual festival was established in 1984 by the Sevda-Cenap And Music Foundation. In addition to Ministry of Culture and Tourism many companies, foundations, diplomatic missions, and the municipality of Çankaya are among the sponsors of the festival.

2018 participants

 Presidential Symphony Orchestra of Turkey 
 Compania Flamenca El Carpeta &Antonio Canales 
 Lucas Vondracek
 Franz Liszt Chamber Orchestra
 Sukhishvili Georgian National Ballet  
 David Hazeltine Trio  
 Bosphorus Trio
 Chorus of   Ministry of Culture and Tourism
 Saygun Quartet
 Cyrus Chesnut Trio
 Spellbound Modern Dance Group
 Sibiu Philharmonic Orchestra

References

1984 establishments in Turkey
Music festivals established in 1984
Culture in Ankara
Music festivals in Turkey
Recurring events established in 1984